George D. Gardner (September 28, 1898 – January, 1974) was an American football and basketball coach.  He was the head football coach at McPherson College in McPherson, Kansas, serving for five seasons, from 1925 until 1929, and compiling a record of 10–25–4.

In 1937, Gardner was named basketball coach at Southwestern College in Winfield, Kansas. At the time he had been working as an insurance agent at Arkansas City, Kansas, where he continued to work when not on coaching duty.

Head coaching record

Football

References

1898 births
1974 deaths
All-American college men's basketball players
Amateur Athletic Union men's basketball players
American men's basketball players
Basketball coaches from Iowa
Basketball players from Iowa
Coaches of American football from Iowa
McPherson Bulldogs football coaches
McPherson Bulldogs men's basketball coaches
People from Arkansas City, Kansas
People from Greene County, Iowa
Players of American football from Kansas
Southwestern Moundbuilders football players
Southwestern Moundbuilders men's basketball players
Southwestern Moundbuilders men's basketball coaches
Washburn Ichabods men's basketball coaches